= Abram Svyadoshch =

- Scientific career
- Fields: sexology, psychiatry, psychotherapy

Abram Svyadoshch (1914–1997) was a Soviet psychiatrist and sexologist.

== Publications ==
- Психотерапия: пособие для врачей. — СПб.: Питер, 2000. — 288 с. — (Современная медицина). — 5000 экз. — ISBN 5-314-00165-9
- Сексопатология. Ситуационные задачи (в соавторстве с М. В. Екимовым)
- Женская сексопатология. Москва: Медицина, 1974.
- Неврозы. Руководство для врачей
